Guy V de Laval (died 1210) was the Lord of Laval, Mayenne.

Family 
Guy was the son of Guy IV de Laval and Emma de Dunstanville. He married Avoise de Craon (died 1230), daughter of Maurice II de Craon. They had issue:

 Guy VI de Laval known as Guyonnet de Laval (died 1211)
 Ozanne, mentioned in a charter of Réau Abbey, cited by Charles Maucourt de Bourjolly
 Emma de Laval (about 1200 - 27 April 1264) who inherited the title in 1211 on the death of her brother Guyonnet. Married Robert I, Count of Alençon (died 1217), Mathieu II de Montmorency (died 1230) and Jean de Choisy et de Toucy.
 Isabeau (Isabelle) de Laval (died 1244) who married Bouchard VI de Montmorency.

See also 
 House of Laval

References

Sources

Medieval French nobility
12th-century French people
House of Laval
Year of birth unknown
1174 deaths